Habana is an album by Roy Hargrove's Crisol. In 1998, the album won Hargrove and the band the Grammy Award for Best Latin Jazz Performance.

Track listing
 "O My Seh Yeh" (Lacy) – 9:59
 "Una Mas" (Dorham) – 8:06
 "Dream Traveler" (Hargrove) – 5:23
 "Nusia's Poem" (Bartz) – 6:20
 "Mr. Bruce" (Valdes) – 5:30
 "Ballad for the Children" (Hargrove) – 4:52
 "The Mountaings" (Hargrove) – 8:07
 "Afrodisia" (Dorham) – 4:46
 "Mambo for Roy" (Valdes) – 11:01
 "O My Seh Yeh (Reprise)" (Lacy) – 6:22

Personnel
 Roy Hargrove – trumpet, flugelhorn
 Gary Bartz – soprano sax, alto sax
 David Sánchez – soprano sax, tenor sax
 Frank Lacy – trombone
 Jesus "Chucho" Valdés, John Hicks – piano
 Russell Malone – guitar
 Jorge Reyes – electric bass
 John Benitez – bass
 Horacio "El Negro" Hernandez, Idris Muhammad – drums
 Miguel "Anga" Diaz – congas
 Jose Luis "Changuito" Quintana – timbales

References

1997 albums
Grammy Award for Best Latin Jazz Album
Latin jazz albums by American artists
Roy Hargrove albums